Al-Rumaitha District is a district of the Al Muthanna Governorate, Iraq.

Districts of Muthanna Governorate